The Loss of El Dorado, by the Nobel Prize winner V. S. Naipaul, is a history book about Venezuela and Trinidad.  It was published in 1969.
The title refers to the El Dorado legend.

Back in London in October 1966, Naipaul received an invitation from the American publisher Little, Brown and Company to write a book on Port-of-Spain.  The book took two years to write, its scope widening with time.  The Loss of El Dorado eventually became a narrative history of Trinidad based on primary sources.  Naipaul and his first wife, Patricia Hale, spent many months in the archives of the British Library reading those sources.  In the end, the finished product was not to the liking of Little, Brown, who were expecting a guidebook.  Alfred A. Knopf agreed to publish it instead in the United States, as did André Deutsch in Britain.

The Loss of El Dorado is an attempt to ferret out an older, deeper history of Trinidad, one preceding its commonly taught history as a plantation colony with an economy resting on the labor of slaves and of indentured workers. Naipaul looked at the Spanish-British rivalry in the Orinoco basin, drawing on contemporary sources written in Spanish and English. The book examines the obsessive search for El Dorado, a Spanish obsession, in turn pursued by the British, to explore the region. In particular, the book examines Sir Walter Raleigh's voyages with a psychological depth more typical of novels than of historical works.

In the book's second half, the focus shifts to Trinidad around the beginning of the nineteenth century under British colonial rule, while revolution of lofty ideals breaks out in South America. Naipaul gave a lot of attention to the circumstances surrounding the trial of Sir Thomas Picton for torture, but he also looked at General Francisco Miranda as the human face of these stories and  Venezuela's struggle for independence from Spain.

Like most of Naipaul's work, "The Loss of El Dorado" has received considerable critical recognition.  On publication, the book won admirers, including the Cambridge historian John H. Plumb. However, Naipaul also confessed to not being completely happy with his book.  He reworked some of its material in a later book, A Way in the World, where he treated historical narrative in a different way, rendering it in part as fiction.

Translation
 La pérdida de El Dorado (Spanish translation by Flora Casas, Madrid 2001).

References

1969 non-fiction books
Books by V. S. Naipaul
André Deutsch books